The 1971 Giro d'Italia was the 54th edition of the Giro d'Italia, one of cycling's Grand Tours. The Giro began with a prologue team time trial in Lecce on 20 May, and Stage 10 occurred on 30 May with a stage to Pian del Falco di Sestola. The race finished in Milan on 10 June.

Prologue
20 May 1971 — Lecce to Brindisi,  (TTT)

Stage 1
21 May 1971 — Brindisi to Bari,

Stage 2
22 May 1971 — Bari to Potenza,

Stage 3
23 May 1971 — Potenza to Benevento,

Stage 4
24 May 1971 — Benevento to Pescasseroli,

Stage 5
25 May 1971 — Pescasseroli to Gran Sasso d'Italia,

Stage 6
26 May 1971 — L'Aquila to Orvieto,

Stage 7
27 May 1971 — Orvieto to San Vincenzo,

Stage 8
28 May 1971 — San Vincenzo to Casciana Terme,

Stage 9
29 May 1971 — Casciana Terme to Forte dei Marmi,

Stage 10
30 May 1971 — Forte dei Marmi to Pian del Falco di Sestola,

References

1971 Giro d'Italia
Giro d'Italia stages